The Buck Shot Show was a local children's television series that aired on CFCN Television in Calgary, Alberta, Canada from 1967 to 1997. From 1967 to 1992 it was a daily program, airing at noon. From 1992 to 1997 it aired Saturday and Sunday mornings. At the time of its cancellation it was the longest-running children's TV show in Canadian history.

The show's host, the avuncular, cowboy-hatted Buck Shot, was played by Calgary entertainer Ron Barge. Other characters included Benny the Bear, Clyde the Owl and Farley, all performed by puppeteers Jim Lewis and Phil Gordon-Cooper.

The theme music for the series was "The Elephant Never Forgets", a playful version of Beethoven's "Turkish March" from 1970 composed by electronic music pioneer Jean-Jacques Perrey.

References

External links
 50 Years of News : CTV Calgary : Jocelyn Laidlaw on Buckshot's legacy
 Jean-Jacques Perrey - The Elephant Never Forgets - The Buck Shot Show Theme Song

1960s Canadian children's television series
1970s Canadian children's television series
1980s Canadian children's television series
1990s Canadian children's television series
1967 Canadian television series debuts
1997 Canadian television series endings
Television shows filmed in Calgary
Canadian television shows featuring puppetry